The Yorkshire Marathon, sponsored by the Asda Foundation, is an annual marathon road running event held in York, UK in October, first held in 2013, and organised by Run For All Events.

History 

In the inaugural running of the event on 20 October 2013, over 3,800 runners finished the event.  Hour-long race highlights produced by Dream Team Television were broadcast two weeks later by Channel 4 and were subsequently shown by other sports channels including Sky Sports, BT Sport, British Eurosport and Premier Sports.

The 2020 edition of the race was postponed to 2021 due to the coronavirus pandemic, with all entries automatically transferred to 2021.

Course 

The course starts the University of York and continues around the City Centre and past York Minster before heading out on the Vale of York and then returning to the finish at the university.

Winners 

Key: 
 Course record

Wheelchair race

Notes

References

External links 
  2013 Results
  2013 Television Highlights

Athletics competitions in England
Marathons in the United Kingdom